The 2nd Pan American Acrobatic Gymnastics Championships were held in Daytona Beach, United States, from October 13 to 15, 2017. The competition was organized by USA Gymnastics, and approved by the International Gymnastics Federation.

Participating nations

Results

Senior

Junior and age groups

Medals table

Senior

Junior and age groups

References

2017 in gymnastics
Pan American Gymnastics Championships
International gymnastics competitions hosted by the United States